FC Spartak Yoshkar-Ola is a Russian football team from Yoshkar-Ola. It played professionally from 1962 to 1998, from 2000 to 2003 and again from 2012/13 season to 2014/15. It played at the second-highest level (Soviet First League and Russian First Division) in 1962, 1968–1969 and 1992–1993. It was called Trud Yoshkar-Ola (1962) and Druzhba Yoshkar-Ola (1975–1998).

In 2012/13 season the team returned to the Russian Second Division. In 2011/12 season Spartak Yoshkar-Ola won Privolzhye zone tournament of the Russian amateur championship.

Current squad
As of 20 April 2017, according to the AFL website.

External links
  Team history at KLISF
 Official Website

Association football clubs established in 1962
Football clubs in Russia
Sport in Yoshkar-Ola
1962 establishments in Russia
Amateur association football teams